Mercito Moya Gesta (pronounced hes-ta, born 12 October 1987) is a Filipino professional boxer who challenged for the IBF lightweight title in 2012 and the WBA lightweight title in 2018. At regional level he held the WBO-NABO lightweight title in 2018.

Gesta began his professional career on 19 October 2003, with a unanimous decision win over Edwin Picardal.

Professional career

lightweight

Gesta vs. Vázquez
Mercito Gesta vs. Miguel Vázquez was on the undercard of Manny Pacquiao vs. Juan Manuel Márquez IV on 8 December 2012. This fight was for the IBF lightweight title. On fight night Gesta was out boxed and outclassed by Vázquez and lost by unanimous decision. The score totals for this fight were 119–109, 118–110, and 117–111.

Gesta vs. Diaz
Gesta was scheduled to fight former IBF super featherweight champion Jojo Diaz on March 18, 2023 on Walter Pyramid, Long Beach, California. Gesta vs Diaz had been scheduled for the co-feature spot, but after light heavyweight contender Gilberto Ramirez came in overweight for his main event fight against Gabe Rosado, the fight was canceled, and the Diaz vs. Gesta fight moved to the headliner slot. The day of the fight Mercito Gesta defeats Joseph Diaz by 10 Round Split Decision the judges’ scores were 99–91, 98–92 for Gesta, and 97–93 for Diaz.

Professional boxing record

Titles in boxing
Regional Title(s):
 WBO-NABO Youth lightweight title
 WBO-NABO lightweight title

References

External links
 

1987 births
Living people
People from Mandaue
Boxers from Cebu
Filipino male boxers
Lightweight boxers
Light-welterweight boxers